This is a list of inclined elevators, organised by place within country and region.

An inclined elevator is distinguished from the similar funicular railway in that its cars operate independently whereas funiculars are composed of two vehicles that synchronously counterbalance one another. Despite this distinction, some inclined elevators use the term funicular in their names, which is seen in both systems converted from funiculars to inclined elevators, such as the Old Quebec Funicular in Quebec City and the Montmartre Funicular in Paris, and in systems built originally as inclined elevators, such as the 100 Street Funicular in Edmonton and the Ljubljana Castle funicular. This list includes counter-weighted, non-counter-weighted and climbing elevators operating on fixed and variable inclinations.

Americas

Belize
 Belcampo Resort, Punta Gorda

Bolivia
 Lav Paz Aerial Tramway Station 17 feeder, Mi Teleférico, La Paz

Brazil
 Pico do Jaraguá, São Paulo

Canada

Alberta
 100 Street Funicular, Edmonton
 Edmonton Convention Centre, Edmonton

Nova Scotia
 Residential Lakeside Tram, Five Islands

Ontario
 Peace Tower, Ottawa (travels on a 10° angle for the first , shifting its position horizontally , and straight up for the  remainder of the climb)

Quebec
 Old Quebec Funicular, Quebec City (converted from funicular to inclined elevator in 1988)
 Olympic Stadium (Montreal), Montreal

Guatemala
 La Lancha Jungle Tram, La Lancha Hotel, Lake Petén Itzá, El Remate

Panama
 Smithsonian Tropical Research Institute Jungle Tram, Panama Canal

United States

Alaska
 Creek Street Funicular Tram, Ketchikan

Arizona
 Scorpion Bay Marina Incline Elevator, Peoria

Arkansas
 Ozark Folk Center, Mountain View

California
 Commercial Installation, Santa Rosa
 Residential Curved Rail & Custom Car Hill Lift, Belvedere (variable inclination)
 Residential Custom Cable Car, Tiburon
 Residential Hillside, Malibu Beach
 Residential Installation, Carmel-by-the-Sea
 San Diego Convention Center, San Diego
 Shadowbrook Restaurant Cable Car, Capitola
 Strand Beach Elevator, Dana Point

Connecticut
 Residential Installation, New Fairfield

Maine
 Residential Hillside Lift, Long Island

Maryland
 Arlington Echo Outdoor Education Center, Millersville
 Patuxent River State Park, Upper Marlboro

Massachusetts
 Pilgrim Monument Inclined Elevator, Provincetown
 White Cliffs Country Club, Cedarville, Plymouth

Michigan
 John Ball Zoological Garden, Grand Rapids

Minnesota
 Residential Lake Tram, Central Minnesota

Missouri
 Gateway Arch Tram, St. Louis (variable inclination)

Nevada
 Luxor Las Vegas hotel, Las Vegas

New York
 Residential Lake Erie Tram, Lake View
 34th Street–Hudson Yards station on the IRT Flushing Line, New York City
 Vessel (structure) (climbing elevator that traces variable inclination), New York City

North Carolina
 Residential Mountain Lake Access, Cashiers

Ohio
 Valvran Roller Coaster evacuation and maintenance inclined elevator, Cedar Point

Pennsylvania
 Ridgewood Incline, Allegheny City (1886-1887)

Puerto Rico
 Hotel El Conquistador, a Waldorf Astoria Resort (Colloquially known as Funicular despite being two independent moving cars), Fajardo, PR

Tennessee
 Hillbilly Golf, Gatlinburg, has an inclined elevator which takes players to the top of a mountain (where they can choose from one of two miniature golf courses) and (on call) picks them up roughly midway up the mountain for the return trip.

Texas
 Cityplace/Uptown station, DART Light Rail in Dallas
 NorthShore Marina Lake Tram Systems, Jonestown
 Rough Hollow Yacht Club and Marina Tram System, Lakeway
 Villas on Travis Lakeside Tram, Austin

Virginia
 George Washington Masonic National Memorial, Alexandria
 Huntington station (Washington Metro), Washington Metropolitan Area Transit Authority, in Huntington

Washington
 Grand Coulee Dam Inclined Elevator, Grand Coulee

Wisconsin
 Clifton Highlands Golf Club, Prescott
 Residential Inclined Tram, Hudson
 Villa Terrace Decorative Arts Museum, Milwaukee

Asia

Mainland China
 Badaling Great Wall railway station, Beijing
 Big Air Shougang, Beijing
 Snow Ruyi National Ski Jumping Centre, Zhangjiakou
 Yesanpo National Park, Baoding
 Oriental Pearl Tower, Shanghai
 Three Centers building, Changde City
 Enshi Grand Canyon, Enshi
 Window of the World, Shenzhen
 Laodong Lu station, Suzhou

Hong Kong
 Discovery Bay, Lantau Island, Hong Kong
 Between Tai Wo Hau Road and Wo Tong Tsui Street, Kwai Chung
 , Bowen Hill
 Tai O Heritage Hotel

Macau
 Taipa Houses–Museum, Taipa, Macau

Philippines
 Tagaytay Highlands, Tagaytay, Philippines (referred to as funicular)
 The Belle View, Tagaytay Highlands, Tagaytay, Philippines.

South Korea
 Namsan Oreumi Elevator, Seoul

Malaysia
 Kek Lok Si Temple, Penang

Singapore
 The Palisades

Europe

Austria
 Agathenhof connection between the Mandalahaus hotel complex and the Oasenbad bathing area, Micheldorf, Carinthia
 Burg Güssing castle, Güssing, Burgenland
 Bergisel Ski Jump, Innsbruck
 Ehrenberg Castle, Reutte, Tyrol
 Hochosterwitz Castle, Launsdorf, Carinthia
 Hohenwerfen Castle, Werfen, Salzburg
 Innerwald Shuttle, Sölden, Tyrol
 Lärchwandschrägaufzug, High Tauern National Park, Kaprun, Austria (Second-widest gauge railway in the world with gauge of )
 Mein Wurmkogel Hotel Snow Cab to ski jump, Sölden/Hochgurgl, Tyrol
 Planai-Hochwurzen-Bahnen Hopsi Express, Schladming, Styria
 Private Villa, Vienna
 Residential lift, Zell am See, Salzburg
 Therma Nova to Hotel connection, Köflach, Styria
 Toni-Seelos-Olympiaschanze ski jump, Seefeld, Tyrol
 Zelfenschanze Inclined Lift, Montafon Nordic Sportzentrum, Tschagguns, Vorarlberg (variable inclination)

Croatia
 Hotel President, Dubrovnik

Czech Republic
 Mrazovka Funicular, connecting the two parts of the Mövenpick Hotel, Smíchov district, Prague

Denmark
 Mountain Dwellings, Copenhagen
 Viborg hospital Cityliner, Viborg

Finland
  in Turku
 Koli National Park (short funicular from parking area to the nature centre)
 Helsinki metro stations: Sörnäinen, Hakaniemi, University of Helsinki, Central railway station, Lauttasaari, Koivusaari and Aalto University.

France
 Eiffel Tower, Paris
 Grand-Hôtel du Cap-Ferrat, French Riviera
 Guerville
 Les Deux Alpes glacier inclined lift
 Montmartre Funicular, Paris (converted from funicular to inclined elevator in 1991)
 Rocamadour inclined elevator
 Saint-Lazare (Paris Metro), Paris
 Tréport funicular, Tréport, Normandy
 University residence on rue de la Tomb-Issoire, Paris

Georgia
 Mount Didveli ski resort, Bakuriani

Germany
 Erdinger Arena ski jump, Oberstdorf, Bavaria
 Göhren Inclined Lift, Göhren, Isle of Rügen, Mecklenburg-Vorpommern
 Heini-Klopfer-Skiflugschanze ski jump, Oberstdorf, Bavaria
 Mühlenkopfschanze ski jump, Willingen, Hesse
 New Town Hall, Hanover (variable inclination)
 Philosophenweg, Heidelberg
 Schlossberg, Schwarzenberg
 Schlossbergbahn, Freiburg im Breisgau, Baden-Württemberg (variable inclination)
 Schrägaufzug at the Ehrenbreitstein Fortress, Koblenz
 Seebrücke Sellin Pier, Sellin, Isle of Rügen, Mecklenburg-Vorpommern

Italy
 Conca di Cheneil Inclined Lift, Valtournenche, Aosta Valley
 Private residence at Pineta di Arenzano, Arenzano
 Convention Hall Inclined Lift, Bassano del Grappa
 Fort Bard, Aosta
 Inclined Panoramic Lift, Villa Carlotta, Lake Como
 Mergellina, Naples Metro, Naples
 Verona funicular, Verona
 Quezzi inclined elevator, Genova
 Renzo Piano Atelier, Genova
 Sanctuary of Our Lady of Montallegro, Rapallo
 Villa Scassi, Genova

Lithuania
 Gediminas Hill Lift, Vilnius

Norway
 DNB ASA Headquarters, Oslo
 Holmenkollbakken ski jump, Oslo
 Nationaltheatret station (Parkveien entrance), Oslo

Portugal
 Goldra Park Elevator, Covilhã
 Santo Andre Elevator, Covilhã

Romania
 Fortress of Deva, Deva (variable inclination)
 Râșnov Citadel, Râșnov

Russian Federation
 Grozny Inclined Lift, Grozny, Chechnia

Slovakia
 Biela Púť ski resort, Jasna Low Tatras

Slovenia
 Ljubljana Castle funicular, Ljubljana
 Škocjan Caves Regional Park

Spain
 Bahia Blanca, Gran Canaria
 Inclined Lifts, Bilbao
 Kukullaga Station, Bilbao metro Line 3, Etxebarri
 Riosol Island of Stars Hotel, Mogán

Sweden
 Ericsson Globe, Stockholm (variable inclination)

Switzerland
 Areal Tinus, St. Moritz
 Bärenpark, Berne
 Burghaldeweg, Küttigen
 Brändlisberg, Steffisburg (Two identical parallel shafts with convex inclination change)
 Brunnmattstrasse, Lenzburg
 Château Gütsch, Lucerne
 Fontana Martina, Ronco sopra Ascona
 Haldenweg, Klingnau
 Herrenmatt, Brugg
 Hungerberg, Aarau
 Inclined elevator train station, Le Locle
 La Scala terrace settlement, Galgenen
 Leisenberg, Liestal
 Les Matins de St. Laurent, La Tzoumaz
 Lindliberg, Schaffhausen
 Lindliweg, Schaffhausen
 Mer de Glace, Nendaz
 Mühlenerstrasse, Rebstein
 Plessur-Halde, Chur
 Power plant access, Montcherand
 Private residence inclined lift, Lugano
 Residenza al Ronco, Cadempino
 Reuchenette-Strasse, Biel
 Ringgenberg, Bern
 Rue Georges-Auguste Matile 5, Neuchâtel
 Scarlett-Sura, Davos
 Schönberg, Gunten
 Schwanau Island, Canton of Schwyz
 Sonnenberg, Schaffhausen
 Sonnenhügel, Glarus
 Tschuggen Grand Hotel, Arosa
 Uptown Mels Development, Mels
 Via Barcone, Ronco sopra Ascona
 Via Colinetta, Ascona
 Villa Pescali, Lugano
 Webermühle, Wettingen
 Weisshorngipfel, Arosa
 Wiggenhalde superstructure, Kriens

Ukraine
 Odessa Funicular, Odessa

United Kingdom

England
 Blists Hill Victorian Town, Madeley, Shropshire
 Greenford station, London
 Millennium Inclinator, London
 National Football Museum in the Urbis, Manchester
 Royal National Lifeboat Institution Padstow Lifeboat Station, Mother Ivy's Bay, Cornwall
 Liverpool Street, connecting the Elizabeth line platforms to the National Rail platforms, Greater London
 Farringdon, connecting the Elizabeth line platforms to the Lindsey Street / Barbican exit near Charterhouse Square, Greater London
 Tyne cyclist and pedestrian tunnels, connecting Jarrow and Howdon, Tyne and Wear (under construction)

Wales
 Ebbw Vale, Blaenau Gwent

Isle of Man
 Douglas, Second Falcon Cliff Lift (1927–1990)

Middle East

Saudi Arabia
 The Headquarters Business Park Tower, Jeddah

Turkey
 Karabük Municipality 2 Duplex units in-Tunnel Inclined Elevator, Karabük
 Kiremitliktepe Ski Jump, Erzurum
 Bodrum

Oceania

Australia
 Scenic World Railway, Katoomba, New South Wales

See also 
 List of funicular railways

References

Inclined elevators